The 1993 BVV Prague Open was a women's tennis tournament played on outdoor clay courts at the I. Czech Lawn Tennis Club in Prague in the Czech Republic that was part of Tier IV of the 1993 WTA Tour. It was the first edition of the  tournament and was held from 13 July until 18 July 1993. Unseeded Natalia Medvedeva won the singles title.

Finals

Singles
 Natalia Medvedeva defeated  Meike Babel 6–3, 6–2
 It was Medvedeva's 1st singles title of the year and the 3rd of her career.

Doubles
 Inés Gorrochategui /  Patricia Tarabini defeated  Laura Golarsa /  Caroline Vis 6–2, 6–1
 It was Gorrochategui's 1st doubles title of the year and the 3rd of her career. It was Tarabini's 1st doubles title of the year and the 8th of her career.

References

External links
 WTA tournament draws

1993 WTA Tour
Prague